James Webster (1734 - 1804) was Archdeacon of Gloucester from 1774 until 1804.

Webster was born in Rampside, educated at Christ's College, Cambridge and ordained in 1758. After a curacy in Grantham he was the incumbent at Much Cowarne.

His grandson was Lieutenant Governor of The Gambia from 1840 to 1841; and then of  Prince Edward Island until 1847.

References

1734 births
18th-century English Anglican priests
19th-century English Anglican priests
Alumni of Christ's College, Cambridge
Archdeacons of Gloucester
1804 deaths
People from Furness